In most cases in Saskatchewan, a hamlet is an unincorporated community with at least five occupied dwellings situated on separate lots and at least 10 separate lots, the majority of which are an average size of less than one acre. Saskatchewan has three different types of unincorporated hamlets including generic "hamlets", "special service areas" and "organized hamlets". The exception to unincorporated hamlets in Saskatchewan is a "northern hamlet", which is a type of incorporated municipality.

Saskatchewan has 11 northern hamlets and 187 unincorporated hamlets including 20 generic hamlets, 23 special service areas and 144 organized hamlets. All northern hamlets are within the Northern Saskatchewan Administration District while all unincorporated hamlets are under the jurisdiction of rural municipalities within southern Saskatchewan. The organized hamlets are established via ministerial order.

Some organized hamlets in Saskatchewan are recognized as designated places by Statistics Canada, while generic hamlets are not. The people in a generic hamlet may apply for organized hamlet status within the rural municipality in which it is located.

Northern hamlets

Unincorporated hamlets

Organized hamlets
Saskatchewan had 146 organized hamlets in 2019. The number was reduced to 144 on January 1, 2020, when the organized hamlets of Indian Point – Golden Sands and Turtle Lake Lodge amalgamated to form the Resort Village of Turtle View.

Hamlets

Special service areas
Like a generic hamlet, a special service area is under the jurisdiction of a rural municipality and does not have any decision-making powers or independent authorities. Unlike a generic hamlet, a special service area may form its own electoral division within the rural municipality and may have a different tax regime within the rural municipality compared to a generic hamlet.

See also
List of communities in Saskatchewan

References

Hamlets